The following are the universiade records in Olympic weightlifting. Records are maintained in each weight class for the snatch lift, Clean and jerk lift, and the total for both lifts by the International Weightlifting Federation.

Men

Women

References

External links
 Universiade records

Universiade
Records
Weightlifting